Homam  is a 2008 Indian Telugu-language thriller film, produced by Kiran Kumar Koneru on Shreya Productions banner and directed by J. D. Chakravarthy. Starring Jagapathi Babu, J. D. Chakravarthy, Mamta Mohandas, Madhurima Tuli  and music composed by Nithin Raikwar & Amar Mohile. The plot is inspired from the American film The Departed which itself was based on the 2002 Hong Kong film Infernal Affairs.

Plot
The film begins with hostility between DIG Vishwanath a candid and underworld kingpin Jawaharlal / Daddy. Mallikarjun / Malli the son of a notorious criminal aims to be sincere police and top scores. Anyhow, he repudiated owing to his family history. Therein, Viswanath inspired and experts him as an undercover cop to nab Daddy. Consequently, Daddy rears an orphan Chandra Shekar / Chandu and ruses to designate him as Police for reverse artifice. Time being, Malli enrolls in Daddy's wing, acquires his credence, and turns into his sidekick. Chandu is forged as a sheer cop and owns the best standing. Alongside, Malli loves Dr. Mahalakshmi and Chandu falls for his neighbor Satya. Once Viswanath gets intel from Malli regarding a huge drug trafficking of Daddy. Immediately takes action, surrounds Daddy, and waits for a spot. Simultaneously, Chandu craftily speaks volumes to Daddy. which ends with Daddy relatively absconding. At that moment, Daddy proclaims to Viswanath about the presence of his man in the department. Like a shot, Viswanath spells occupancy of his spy in his gang. 

In that alarm, several pawns are moved by two teams to get the black sheep. Meanwhile, Malli’s mother is ailing to be happy he states his identity which she does not able to believe. So, Malli secretly rendezvous with Viswanath to disclose him as a genuine person who promises to do so. At this point, Chandu detects the squealer is on hand and notifies Daddy. Forthwith, Daddy arrives therein, when Malli escapes in a bet. But tragically, Visawanath dies in the attack. It forms a severe impact on Malli as Viswanath is the one who knew the truth. However, his piece of identity is preserved in a secret computer. Concurrently, Daddy has laid the groundwork for a new deal when Chandu advises it is not the right time. Accordingly, Daddy mumbles scorn and intimidates him. In bride, Chandu scans the link between Viswanath & Malli when he communicates, and requests Malli to mingle with him for the accomplishment of Viswanath's dream which he accepts. Utilizing Malli, Chandu eliminates Daddy as vengeance and buries his diabolic shade. The next, Chandu asks Malli to collect his ID at his office where Malli realizes Chandu is the miscreant & felon. By the time, Chandu destroys his ID when Malli tactically unearths the truth by entrapping Chandu. At last, Chandu is knocked out in a Police encounter. Finally, the movie ends on a happy note with Malli getting his recognition and proceeding to Pakistan on a covert operation.

Cast

 Jagapathi Babu as Mallikarjuna alias Malli, an undercover IPS officer
 J. D. Chakravarthy as Chandrashekhar aka Chandu, another police officer
 Mamta Mohandas as Dr. Mahalakshmi
 Madhurima Tuli as Satya
 Pradeep Rawat as DIG Vishwanath
 Mahesh Manjrekar as Daddy
 Ahuti Prasad as Jayaram (DGP of Crime & Intelligence)
 M. S. Narayana as P.C.Sarkar 
 Krishna Bhagawan
 Brahmaji as S.P.Nayak
 Janaki as Tayaru (Malli's mother)
 Raja Ravindra as Inspector Arshad
 CVL Narasimha Rao as Lawyer Subba Rao
 Bangalore Padma as Sarkar's wife
 Prabhakar as Potti Sathi
 Ram Jagan as Tumry
 Tarzan as Goud
 Sakshi Sivanand as item Number
 Jyothi Rana as item Number

Soundtrack

Music was composed by Nithin Raikwar. Lyrics were written by Suddala Ashok Teja. Music was released on ADITYA Music Company.

Reception
Released on 29 August 2008, the film opened to good reviews. Rediff.com thought that Chakravarthy fared better as an actor than as a director. While continuing in its discussion, it specifically commends Jagapathi Babu and Mahesh Manjrekar for their performances. The female actors, Mamta Mohandas and debutant Madhurima were added to the glamor quotient. Another such review equally praised Babu and Chakravarthy for their histrionics. While discussing the technical aspects of the film, the reviewer thought that Chakravarthy "scripted the screenplay with perfection and did not lose grip on the story at any point of time." From certain scenes and filming methodology, another review thought that Chakravarthy's direction was influence by his mentor Ram Gopal Varma. While the music was termed as tasteless, cinematography and editing were acceptable by the reviewer. Overall, the film was rated as hit and the review suggested that its plot was inspired by the 2002 Hong Kong crime thriller Infernal Affairs (which this movie was remade as 2006 Hollywood movie, The Departed, directed by Martin Scorsese). Director Chakravarthy corroborated this fact in an interview where he said that the movie The Departed (remade based on the original Infernal Affairs) was inspiration to some extent, but his film varied a lot in its narration and treatment.

References

External links
 

2008 films
Indian crime thriller films
2000s Telugu-language films
2008 crime thriller films
Films about organised crime in India
Indian gangster films
Indian remakes of Hong Kong films